Qalandarabad-e Pain (also Romanized as Qalandarābād-e Pā’īn; also known as Qalandarābād) is a village in Soltanali Rural District, in the Central District of Gonbad-e Qabus County, Golestan Province, Iran. At the 2006 census, its population was 747, in 148 families.

References 

Populated places in Gonbad-e Kavus County